The Film About Alekseyev is a 2014 Russian drama film directed by Mikhail Segal.

Plot 
The film tells about a man who drank tea with Tarkovsky, got into the KGB because of Gagarin, competed with Kalashnikov and Vysotsky and suddenly learns about the trace that he left in the fate of the people around him.

Cast 
 Aleksandr Zbruyev as Alekseyev
 Aleksey Kapitonov as young Alekseyev
 Tatyana Mayst as Arkhipova
 Kseniya Radchenko
 Darya Gutsul
 Anastasiya Popkova as Asya, Alekseyev's wife
 Denis Fomin as Sasha, Alekseyev's friend
 Svetlana Pervushina as Lika, Sasha's wife
 Maksim Vinogradov
 Andrey Makarevich

References

External links 
 

2014 films
2010s Russian-language films
Russian drama films
2014 drama films